The Everett Herald is a daily newspaper based in Everett, Washington, United States. It is owned by Sound Publishing, Inc. The paper serves residents of Snohomish County.

History

The Daily Herald was first published on February 11, 1901, by S. A. Perkins and S. E. Wharton. An earlier newspaper known as the Herald had been established in 1891 and ceased publication during the Panic of 1893. The second incarnation of the Herald, originally named the Everett Independent, was sold to James B. Best in 1905. The newspaper established a satellite news bureau for southern Snohomish County in May 1954, which later became the Western Sun edition in 1970.

The Herald moved its offices and printing presses to a building on California Street in 1959. The Best family owned the newspaper until it was sold in 1978 to the Washington Post Company. On April 5, 1981, the Herald published its first Sunday edition and folded the Western Sun edition into the countywide newspaper. The Daily Herald's website, HeraldNet.com, was launched on January 5, 1997.

For years, The Daily Herald was an afternoon paper. It is now a morning paper. The newspaper also acquired a chain of weekly newspapers under The Enterprise in southern Snohomish County, which it operated from 1996 to 2012.

On February 6, 2013, the Washington Post Company announced it was selling the paper to the Sound Publishing division of Black Press, based in Victoria, British Columbia. The newspaper then moved to Sound Publishing's offices on Colby Avenue in Everett. The newspaper's printing plant near Paine Field was replaced by a new Sound Publishing plant in Lakewood. The plant will include a press acquired from The Gazette of Cedar Rapids, Iowa.

On July 19, 2022, editorial staff members at the Herald announced their intention to unionize, citing poor wages and an inability to retain staff as key concerns they wished to address. 

On Sept. 8, 2022, the Herald's newsroom employees voted unanimously to unionize.

On Dec. 25, 2022, The Herald announced it would start using the U.S. Postal Service for same-day delivery. The paper also announced it would cease publishing a Sunday edition and that the Monday edition would be online only.

Notable court cases
In March 1983, The Daily Herald  lost an appellate court case in the State of Washington in which it sought to quash a subpoena allowing a judicial review of confidential material gathered for articles it had published in 1979 on the cult activities of Theodore Rinaldo, who had since been convicted on charges of rape, indecent liberties and assault.  The New York Times reported that the court had ruled that "criminal defendants could force reporters to reveal confidential sources if the information was crucial to the case" and characterized the loss as  "a major defeat for the news media". The Daily Herald took the Appeals Court decision to the Washington Supreme Court in State v. Rinaldo 102 Wn.2d 749 (1984), which was heard en banc with the result that the subpoena itself was quashed on the basis that Rinaldo had not met the threshold requirements to compel such an inspection, while upholding the Court of Appeals ruling in general.

References

External links
 

Black Press newspapers
Daily newspapers published in the United States
Everett, Washington
Mass media in Snohomish County, Washington
Newspapers published in Washington (state)
Publications established in 1901